George C. Braden (August 18, 1868 – January 8, 1942) was an American politician who served as the 41st lieutenant governor of Ohio from 1928 to 1929.

References

People from Trumbull County, Ohio
1868 births
1942 deaths
Ohio Republicans
Lieutenant Governors of Ohio